John Chivers (born 6 November 1944) is  a former Australian rules footballer who played with Richmond in the Victorian Football League (VFL).

Notes

External links 

Living people
1944 births
Australian rules footballers from Tasmania
Richmond Football Club players
Clarence Football Club players